Classical Gaelic or Classical Irish was a shared literary form of Gaelic that was in use by poets in Scotland and Ireland from the 13th century to the 18th century.

Although the first written signs of Scottish Gaelic having diverged from Irish appear as far back as the 12th century annotations of the Book of Deer, Scottish Gaelic did not have a separate standardised form and did not appear in print on a significant scale until the 1767 translation of the New Testament into Scottish Gaelic; however, in the 16th century, John Carswell's , an adaptation of John Knox's Book of Common Order, was the first book printed in either Scottish or Irish Gaelic.

Before that time, the vernacular dialects of Ireland and Scotland were considered to belong to a single language, and in the late 12th century a highly formalized standard variant of that language was created for the use in bardic poetry. The standard was created by medieval Gaelic poets based on the vernacular usage of the late 12th century and allowed a lot of dialectal forms that existed at that point in time, but was kept conservative and had been taught virtually unchanged throughout later centuries. The grammar and metrical rules were described in a series of grammatical tracts and linguistic poems used for teaching in bardic schools.

Grammar 
The grammar of Classical Gaelic is laid out in a series of grammatical tracts written by native speakers and intended to teach the most cultivated form of the language to student bards, lawyers, doctors, administrators, monks, and so on in Ireland and Scotland. Some of the tracts were edited and published by Osborn Bergin as a supplement to Ériu between 1916 and 1955 under the title Irish Grammatical Tracts and some with commentary and translation by Lambert McKenna in 1944 as Bardic Syntactical Tracts.

Neuter nouns still trigger eclipsis of a following complement, as they did in Middle Irish, but less consistently. The distinction between preposition + accusative to show motion toward a goal (e.g.  "into the battle") and preposition + dative to show non–goal-oriented location (e.g.  "in the battle") is kept in the standard even though it is lost in the spoken language during this period. The standard also keeps the distinction between nominative and accusative case in some classes of nouns and requires the use of accusative for direct object of the verb if it's different in form from the nominative.

Verb endings are also in transition. The ending -ann (which spread from conjuct forms of Old Irish n-stem verbs like  "(he) hits, strikes"), today the usual 3rd person ending in the present tense, was originally just an alternative ending found only in verbs in dependent position, i.e. after particles such as the negative, but it started to appear in independent forms in 15th century prose and was common by 17th century. This innovation was not followed in Scottish Gaelic, where the ending -ann has never spread, but the present and future tenses were merged:  "he will grasp" but  "he will not grasp".

Encoding
ISO 639-3 gives the name "Hiberno-Scottish Gaelic" (and the code ghc) to cover both Classical Gaelic and Early Modern Irish.

Notes

References
 
 
 
 
 
 

Gaelic
Irish dialects
Scottish Gaelic dialects
History of the Irish language